Strausfeld is a surname. Notable people with the surname include: 

Lisa Strausfeld (born 1964/65), American design professional and information architect
Nicholas Strausfeld (born 1942), British neuroscientist
Peter Strausfeld (1910–1980), German–born British artist and illustrator